A. N. Swamy Venkatadri Iyer (13 January 1898 – 14 February 1939), known by his pen name as Samsa, was an early 20th century's Indian historical playwright in Kannada language. His plays Suguna Gambhira, Vigada Vikramaraya and Bettada Arasu have been made into stage dramas and prescribed as textbooks in various universities in Karnataka. He was called as Shakespeare of Kannada Drama. An open air theatre in the premises of government owned Ravindra Kalakshetra, is named after Samsa.

Personal life 

Samsa was born as Venkatadri Iyer to Narasimha Pandita and Gowramma in Agara, Yelandur in erstwhile Kingdom of Mysore. He worked in various schools and offices as teacher and clerk across Mysore, Hassan, Mumbai and other places. He was known for his eccentric behavior. He remained unmarried and led a secluded life.  
He suffered from Persecution Complex and used to wander from one place to another.

As writer 

It's said that Samsa had written more than 23 dramas out of which only 6 are available. He is regarded as the first historical playwright in modern Kannada literature. His plays were based on the administration and history of Mysore kings in the Kingdom of Mysore. The language he used in dramas was Halegannada.

Plays
 Suguna Gambhira
 Birudanthembara Ganda
 Vigada Vikramaraya
 Bettada Arasu
 Vijayanarasimha
 Manthrashakti

Novels
 Koushala
 Sherlock Homes in Jail

Poems
 Shreemanthodyana Varnanam
 Samsapadam
 Eeshaprakopana
 Naraka Duryodhaneeyam
 Acchumba

Death 

Samsa committed suicide on 14 February 1939 in a small room of Sadvidya School, Mysore where he spent last years of his life. He left a suicide note:

Books on Samsa 
Many writers have tried bringing things out from Samsa's secluded life. Notable works on him are:

 "Samsa Kavi" (Biography) – G. P. Rajarathnam
 "Samsa Smarane: Jeevana Chithrana" – Aa. Na. Subramanyam 
 "Neegikonda Samsa" (play) – Ki. Ram. Nagaraj
 "Samsa" (novel) – Prof. Maleyur Guruswamy

References 

Writers in British India
Kannada poets
1898 births
1939 deaths
20th-century Indian writers
Kannada people
1939 suicides
Suicides in India